Mamer Lycée railway station is a railway station in Mamer, in south-western Luxembourg.  It is named after the Lycée Technique Josy Barthel, which it was built to serve.  It is operated by Chemins de Fer Luxembourgeois, the state-owned railway company.

The station also serves the European School, Luxembourg II. In 2013 some parents at the school expressed concern with the speeds of some of the trains.

The station is situated on Line 50, which connects Luxembourg City to the west of the country and the Belgian town of Arlon.

References

External links
 Official CFL page on Mamer Lycée station
 Rail.lu page on Mamer Lycée station

Railway stations in Mamer
Railway stations on CFL Line 50
Railway stations opened in 2003